Afroeurydemus garambaensis is a species of leaf beetle of the Democratic Republic of the Congo and Ivory Coast, described by Brian J. Selman in 1972.

References 

Eumolpinae
Beetles of Africa
Beetles of the Democratic Republic of the Congo
Insects of West Africa
Beetles described in 1972